Tachie may refer to:

 Desmond Tachie (born 1984), Ghanaian-Canadian soccer player
 Tachie, British Columbia, Canada

See also

 Tachi (disambiguation)
 Tachie-Mensah